is a Japanese retired football player.

Playing career
Nozawa was born in Shizuoka on November 9, 1979. He joined J1 League club Shimizu S-Pulse from youth team in 1998. However he could not play at all in the match behind Masanori Sanada in 2 seasons. In 2000, he moved to J2 League club Albirex Niigata. Although he could not play at all in the match in 2000, he became a regular goalkeeper from 2001. The club won the champions in 2003 and was promoted to J1 from 2004. However his opportunity to play decreased behind Takashi Kitano from 2006. In 2009, he moved to J2 club Shonan Bellmare. In 2009, he played full time in all matches and the club was promoted to J1 from 2010. However he lost regular position for spinal disc herniation in 2010 and he could not play at all in the match behind new member Yohei Nishibe in 2011. In 2012, he moved to Matsumoto Yamaga FC. Although he played many matches in 2012, he could hardly play in the match for spinal disc herniation from 2013. In 2015, he moved to Albirex Niigata Singapore. In 2019, he returned to Japan and signed with J2 League club Albirex Niigata for the first time in 11 years. He retired in December 2019.

Club statistics

References

External links

1979 births
Living people
Association football people from Shizuoka Prefecture
Japanese footballers
J1 League players
J2 League players
Shimizu S-Pulse players
Albirex Niigata players
Shonan Bellmare players
Matsumoto Yamaga FC players
Albirex Niigata Singapore FC players
Association football goalkeepers